The men's light flyweight boxing competition at the 2016 Summer Olympics in Rio de Janeiro was held from 6 to 14 August at the Riocentro.

Competition format
Like all Olympic boxing events, the competition was a straight single-elimination tournament. This event consisted of 22 boxers who have qualified for the competition through various qualifying tournaments held in 2015 and 2016. The competition began with a preliminary round on 6 August, where the number of competitors was reduced to 16, and concluded with the final on 14 August. As there were fewer than 32 boxers in the competition, a number of boxers received a bye through the preliminary round. Both semi-final losers were awarded bronze medals.

All bouts consisted of three three-minute rounds. Beginning this year, the competition was scored using the "must-ten" scoring system.

Schedule 
All times are Brasília Time (UTC−3).

Results

Finals

Top half

Bottom half

References

Boxing at the 2016 Summer Olympics
Men's events at the 2016 Summer Olympics